Zorah or Tzorah, was a biblical town in the Judaean Foothills. It has been identified with the former village of Sar'a, now often referred to as Tel Tzora.

Location
Zorah was situated on the crest of a hill overlooking the valley of Sorek.

It is located 23 kilometers west of Jerusalem near Nahal Sorek.

History
Zorah was mentioned together with Ajalon in the Amarna letters as a city attacked by the Apiru. Zorah has been identified with the biblical Zoreah, and is the birthplace of Samson.  states:
"there was a certain man from Zorah, of the family of the Danites, whose name was Manoah".  
Samson's grave is recorded as being near there, and which the historian Josephus says was in a village called Sarasat.

In , Zorah is mentioned in the allotment of the Tribe of Judah, on the border with the Tribe of Dan. It was most likely the Danites who occupied Zorah.

According to the Book of Chronicles, it was fortified by Rehoboam.

The Palestinian village Sar'a was located in the presumed location of the ancient town. It was depopulated during the 1948 Arab–Israeli War. Conder and Kitchener, describing the site in 1881, said that, with the exception of the olive groves to the north of the village, the low hill on which the village lies is "bare and white," a place now planted with a pine forest by the Jewish National Fund.

Kibbutz Tzora is now located nearby, at the foot of Zorah mountain, on its southern side.

Archeology 
Caves, tombs, cisterns and a winepress were discovered at Tel Tzora. Two winepresses were carved into the rock, one of which was paved with mosaic.

A rock-hewn altar was found just below the tell. It has been nicknamed "Manoah's Altar", after Samson's father.

References

External links
 Surah (Zorah) in Survey of Western Palestine, Map 17:  IAA, Wikimedia commons

 
Hebrew Bible cities
Former populated places in Southwest Asia
Archaeological sites in Israel